Smriti Khanna is an Indian television actress and a former model. She is known for playing the role of Jo in Channel V's It's Complicated and Ritika Zaveri in Colors TV's Meri Aashiqui Tum Se Hi.

Personal life
She is married to Gautam Gupta  on 23 November 2017. Their daughter, Anayka was born on 15 April 2020.

Career
In 2013, Khanna was seen in Punjabi film Jatt Airways. In February 2015, Khanna portrayed the role of Reeva in Yeh Hai Aashiqui. In the same year, she made a cameo appearance in Nadaniyaan. Khanna played the role of Ritika Zaveri in Meri Aashiqui Tum Se Hi. In June 2016, Khanna was hired to portray Vandana in Colors TV's Balika Vadhu. She later appeared in Kasam Tere Pyaar Ki as Malaika and Iss Pyaar Ko Kya Naam Doon 3 as Sasha.

Filmography

Television

Films

References

External links

Smriti Khanna at IMDb

Living people
Indian television actresses
Indian film actresses
1990 births